Craig y Mor is a house overlooking Treaddur Bay on Anglesey, Wales. The house dates from the early 20th century and has always been privately-owned. It is a Grade II listed building.

History
Treaddur Bay developed as a seaside resort in the 19th century. By the 20th century, it had become popular with the wealthy middle-classes from Liverpool. William Smellie, the builder of Craig y Mor, was born in Glasgow in the 1870s, and rose to become chairman and managing director of Meade-King, Robinson, a manufacturing company based in Liverpool which developed a highly-profitable relationship with Lever Brothers, principally in the production of soap. In 1911, Smellie determined to build a holiday home on Anglesey and engaged the architect Frederick George Hicks. Hicks, born in England, had moved to Dublin in the late 19th century, and developed a successful career becoming President both of the Architectural Association of Ireland and of the Royal Institute of the Architects of Ireland. Construction on Craig y Mor was interrupted by the First World War and the house was not completed until 1922.

William Smellie died in 1955 and his widow six years later. The house remains a private home in the possession of the family and is not open to the public. It is rented for film and photographic shoots.

Architecture and description
Craig y Mor was designed by Hicks in a Neo-Georgian style. It is "large", and constructed of snecked rubble with a tiled roof. Richard Haslam, Julian Orbach and Adam Voelcker, in their 2009 edition, Gwynedd, of the Pevsner Buildings of Wales series, consider the double-height bay window "overlooking the sea, its boldest feature".

The house is a Grade II listed building, the Cadw listing record describing it as "ambitious in scale, dramatic in massing, and refined in detail."

Notes

References

Sources
 

Buildings and structures in Anglesey
Grade II listed buildings in Anglesey
Country houses in Anglesey